
Year 467 (CDLXVII) was a common year starting on Sunday (link will display the full calendar) of the Julian calendar, the 467th Year of the Common Era (CE) and Anno Domini (AD) designations, the 467th year of the 1st millennium, the 67th year of the 5th century, and the 8th year of the 460s decade. At the time, it was known as the Year of the Consulship of Pusaeus and Iohannes (or, less frequently, year 1220 Ab urbe condita). The denomination 467 for this year has been used since the early medieval period, when the Anno Domini calendar era became the prevalent method in Europe for naming years.

Events 
 By place 

 Roman Empire 
 April 12 – Emperor Leo I has his general Anthemius elected emperor of the Western Roman Empire. He allies himself with Ricimer, de facto ruler of Rome, and marries his daughter Alypia to him, to strengthen the relationship and end the hostilities between the Eastern and Western Empire.
 Summer – King Genseric extends his pirate raids in the Mediterranean Sea; the Vandals sack and enslave the people living in Illyricum, the Peloponnese and other parts of Greece. Leo I joins forces with the Western Empire.

 Britannia 
 Ancient Hillforts in Britain are re-fortified, and  the Wansdyke is built (approximate date).

 Asia 
 Emperor Skandagupta dies after a 12-year reign, as Huns consolidate their conquests in western India. He is succeeded by his half-brother Purugupta.

Births 
 October 13 – Emperor Xiaowen of Northern Wei, emperor of Northern Wei (d. 499)
 Cerdic, first king of Anglo-Saxon Wessex (approximate date) 
 Leo II, Byzantine emperor (d. 474)
 Emperor Shun of Liu Song, Chinese emperor of Liu Song (d. 479)

Deaths 
 Benignus of Armagh, Irish bishop (approximate date)
 Skandagupta, ruler of the Gupta Empire (India)

References